Assyrian language may refer to:

 Ancient Assyrian language, a dialect of the ancient East Semitic Akkadian language
 In modern Assyrian terminology, related to Neo-Aramaic languages:
 Suret language, a modern West Semitic language that belongs to the Northeastern Neo-Aramaic branch
 Turoyo language, a modern West Semitic language, part of the Central Neo-Aramaic branch

See also
 Assyria (disambiguation)
 Assyrian (disambiguation)
 Eastern Assyrian (disambiguation)
 Western Assyrian (disambiguation)
 Syrian language (disambiguation)